Ožiljak ("The Scar") is first album from Miladin Šobić. Miladin wrote all the songs himself.

Track listing 
 Džemper za vinograd (Sweater for a Vineyard)
 Stare novine (Old Newspapers)
 Pokvaren telefon - Izbjeglica (A Broken Telephone - Refugee)
 Kad klonem snagom (When I lose my strength)
 Sunce tebi, sunce meni (Sun to you, Sun to me)
 Prođoh gradom (I went through the city)
 Prvi jutarnji (First morning)
 Kad bi došla Marija (If Marija would come) Video of a song
 A vrijeme ide dalje (But Time Goes On)
 Od druga do druga (From Friend to Friend)

See also 

Miladin Šobić
SFR Yugoslav Pop and Rock scene

1981 albums